Acontiinae is a subfamily of bird dropping moths in the family Noctuidae. There are more than 50 genera and 430 described species in Acontiinae, found worldwide in temperate and tropical climates.

Genera
These 52 genera belong to the subfamily Acontiinae:

 Tribe Acontiini Guenée, 1841
 Acontia Ochsenheimer, 1816
 Eusceptis Hübner, 1823
 Phyllophila Guenée, 1852
 Ponometia Herrich-Schäffer, 1868
 Pseudalypia H.Edwards, 1874
 Spragueia Grote, 1875
 Tarache Hübner, 1823
 Tribe Armadini
 Armada Staudinger, 1884
 Asplenia Hampson, 1916
 Tribe Chamaecleini
 Aleptinoides Barnes & McDunnough, 1912
 Austrazenia Warren, 1913
 Chalcoecia Hampson, 1908
 Chamaeclea Grote, 1883
 Heminocloa Barnes & Benjamin, 1924
 Hemioslaria Barnes & Benjamin, 1924
 Megalodes Guenee, 1852
 Thurberiphaga Dyar, 1920
 Trogotorna Hampson, 1910
 Not placed in a tribe
 Acrobyla Rebel, 1903
 Alypophanes Turner, 1908
 Apaustis Hübner, 1823
 Barastrotia Warren, 1913
 Bostrodes Hampson, 1910
 Chamyris Guenée, 1852
 Chara Staudinger, 1892
 Cingalesa Hampson, 1884
 Drasteriodes Hampson, 1926
 Drobeta Walker, 1858
 Duhemia Rungs, 1943
 Ectrogatha Hampson, 1910
 Emmelia
 Heterorta Warren, 1913
 Lambana Walker, 1866
 Metacausta Hampson, 1910
 Metopoceras Guenee, 1850
 Mimoruza Hampson, 1895
 Outaya Chrétien, 1911
 Oxytrita Warren, 1913
 Parerastria Warren, 1914
 Perynea Hampson, 1910
 Pseudacidalia Hampson, 1894
 Pyraloides Rebel, 1948
 Rabila Walker, 1865
 Rhodotarache Warren, 1914
 Shiraia
 Stemmaphora Staudinger, 1888
 Stenocryptis Warren, 1913
 Stenorache Hampson, 1910
 Tephrochares Zerny, 1933
 Trissernis Meyrick, 1902
 Trogoblemma Hampson, 1910

References

Further reading

External links

 

 
Noctuidae